The Hispaniolan common tree frog, Hispaniolan laughing tree frog (Osteopilus dominicensis), or Dominican tree frog, is a species of frog in the family Hylidae endemic to the island of Hispaniola (both the Dominican Republic and Haiti).

Habitat
It is an abundant, ubiquitous species on Hispaniola, found from sea level up to  asl. It occurs anywhere near water in forests and anthropogenic open areas. It breeds in standing bodies water, both temporary and permanent.

References

Osteopilus
Endemic fauna of Hispaniola
Amphibians of the Dominican Republic
Frogs of Haiti
Amphibians described in 1838
Taxonomy articles created by Polbot